Petrovac is a municipality located in Republika Srpska, an entity of Bosnia and Herzegovina. It is situated in the western part of Republika Srpska and the central part of the Krajina region. Petrovac was created from a small part of the pre-war municipality of Bosanski Petrovac, whose remaining portion kept the original name and is a part of the Federation of Bosnia and Herzegovina. The municipality seat is the village of Drinić.

Geography
Petrovac is a rural municipality, consisting of villages Bunara, Drinić and Podsrnetica and parts of Bravski Vaganac, Bukovača,and Klenovac. It is located between municipalities of Bosanski Petrovac in the north and west, Ribnik and Istočni Drvar in the east, and Drvar in the south. The total area of the municipality is 137 km2, about a sixth of 853 km2 of the pre-war municipality.

History
Petrovac was created in 1995 following the end of the Bosnian War. As of 2019, it is one of the smallest municipalities by number of inhabitants in Republika Srpska.

Demographics

Population

Ethnic composition

See also
 Municipalities of Republika Srpska

References

Municipalities of Republika Srpska